Tabitha Bonita Brown (née Thomas; born February 4, 1979) is an American actress and social media personality. She creates online video content incorporating veganism, humor and motivational speaking. Brown has over 5 million followers on TikTok and over 4.2 million followers on Instagram . She has been described by HuffPost as "America's Mom" and her content has been characterized by critics as being "comforting" and "calming".

Born in North Carolina, Brown studied fashion briefly before dropping out and pursuing acting. After developing chronic pain and fatigue, Brown switched to a vegan diet to help with relief. She created her TikTok account in 2020 and began amassing followers shortly thereafter.

Brown has appeared in television shows such as The Chi and Good Morning America. In 2021, Brown was awarded the Outstanding Social Media Personality title at the NAACP Image Awards. Her first book, Feeding the Soul (because it's my business): Finding Our Way to Joy, Love and Freedom, was published the same year, and she published her first cookbook, Cooking from the Spirit: Easy, Delicious, and Joyful Plant-Based Inspirations, the next.

Early life and career

1979–2007: Early years and career beginnings 
Brown was born in Eden, North Carolina. Raised in Stoneville, she grew up in Eden. She began studying fashion design at Miami International University of Art & Design, but dropped out at age 19 and moved to Laguna Niguel, California. After struggling financially, she returned to North Carolina, this time moving to Greensboro, where she lived for five years.

In 2002, Brown got a job as the co-host of a local late-night show, where she interviewed celebrities who performed at Greensboro Coliseum Complex. In 2004, with husband in tow, she moved back to Los Angeles where she tried stand-up comedy. After failing to land as a TV actress, Brown spent five years working at a Macy's in Century City. Six months after the move to California, Brown began traveling between North Carolina and Los Angeles to care for her mother who had developed ALS.

2008–2016: Acting and performance hiatus 
Brown had spent three years taking care of her mother. Following her mother's death in 2007, Brown began her career acting small roles in several indie films and direct-to-video films. Brown subsequently developed chronic pain and fatigue and could not work for a year. Brown was introduced to veganism after her daughter had suggested adopting it to help with her recovery.

Social media breakthrough 
In late 2017, Brown was running out of disability insurance funds, which led to her becoming an Uber driver in October 2017, in order to make ends meet as a "struggling" part-time actress. Her video review from December 2017 of a Whole Foods Market vegan BLT sandwich went viral, after which the company hired her as a brand ambassador to travel the country. In early March 2020, she created a TikTok account on which she began sharing vegan recipes, cooking tips, family moments, and encouraging advice, amassing 2 million followers in the space of five weeks. Brown had also been broadcasting live cooking shows and product reviews on Facebook live since early 2018.

In late April 2020, Brown was signed to Creative Artists Agency. In late June 2020, she began hosting All Love on Ellen Digital Network. In 2021, Brown hosted the YouTube Original children's show Tab Time. The same year, she launched a hair care line named "Donna's Recipe" after her name for her afro, and she published her first book, Feeding the Soul (because it's my business): Finding Our Way to Joy, Love and Freedom, which became No. 1 on The New York Times Best Seller list. In 2022, she published her debut cookbook Cooking from the Spirit: Easy, Delicious, and Joyful Plant-Based Inspirations, launched a clothing collection with Target Corporation, and appeared on Good Morning America.

Brown's YouTube show Tab Time was nominated for two categories in the inaugural Children's and Family Emmy Awards, Outstanding Preschool Series and Outstanding host.

Cooking from the Spirit 
In 2022, William Morrow published Brown's cookbook Cooking from the Spirit: Easy, Delicious, and Joyful Plant-Based Inspirations. The book was featured on NPR and Good Morning America. Essence magazine reported Brown went on a two-week book tour that ended with a final appearance at the Regent Theatre in Los Angeles. Journalist Avery Yale Kamila listed Cooking from the Spirt on her list of the best vegan cookbooks of 2022. DeAnna Taylor of Ebony magazine listed the book on her list of 7 cookbooks to leave Thanksgiving guests wanting more. Oprah Daily listed the book as number 8 on its 2022 list of "16 Books to Gift Your Favorite Bibliophiles." In 2023, USA Today listed the book's peach cobbler recipe on a list of egg-free recipes to try as egg prices rise.

Personal life
Brown is married to Chance Brown, a retired LAPD officer with whom she co-hosts Fridays with Tab & Chance on IGTV. Together, they have two children; Choyce and Queston. They reside in Los Angeles, California.

Books 

 Feeding the Soul (because it's my business): Finding Our Way to Joy, Love and Freedom
 Cooking from the Spirit: Easy, Delicious, and Joyful Plant-Based Inspirations

Filmography 
Adapted from IMDb:

Film 
As Writer

As Actress

Television 

Psychic on The Conner Sept 22nd, 2021

Awards and nominations

References

External links 
 
 

1979 births
Living people
21st-century American actresses
American TikTokers
American Internet celebrities
People from Eden, North Carolina
African-American actresses
American veganism activists
Actresses from North Carolina
Entertainers from North Carolina
American television actresses
21st-century African-American women
21st-century African-American people
20th-century African-American people
20th-century African-American women